Alexander or Alex Laing may refer to: 
 Alexander Laing (Scottish poet) (1787–1857), Scottish verse writer
 Alexander Gordon Laing (1794–1826), Scottish explorer
 Alexander Laing (architect) (1752–1823), Scottish architect
 Alexander Laing (American writer) (1903–1976), American poet and writer of sea stories
 Alex Laing (footballer), New Zealand football goalkeeper 
 Alex Laing (rugby union) (1865–?), Scottish rugby union player